Driven by Dreams is a Canadian documentary film, directed by Serge Giguère and released in 2006. The film profiles five senior citizens who are still driven by the passion to pursue hobbies and aspirations, including painting, singing and flying miniature airplanes.

The film premiered on November 9, 2006, at the Montreal International Documentary Festival. It was later screened at the 2007 Hot Docs Canadian International Documentary Festival, where it received a Special Jury Prize from the Best Canadian Feature Documentary jury.

The film won the Jutra Award for Best Documentary Film at the 9th Jutra Awards in 2007.

References

External links

2007 films
2007 documentary films
Canadian sports documentary films
2010s English-language films
English-language Canadian films
2010s Canadian films
National Film Board of Canada documentaries
Documentary films about old age
Best Documentary Film Jutra and Iris Award winners